The Surrey Police Service (SPS) is a municipal police force currently assuming jurisdiction over the City of Surrey, British Columbia, Canada. It is one of several police departments within the Metro Vancouver Regional District, and as of December 2022, the second largest municipal police service in British Columbia.

In 2021, Surrey was Canada's largest city without a municipal police service. The Surrey RCMP detachment, which the SPS is replacing, is the force's largest contract detachment.

History 
Surrey maintained a municipal police department until May 1, 1951, when policing duties were contracted out to the RCMP under a Police Service Agreement.

During Mayor Doug McCallum's first term (1996-2002), Surrey City Council considered establishing a municipal police service in response to low RCMP staffing, but ultimately remained with the RCMP due to the high cost of establishing a police force. 

On November 5, 2018, during McCallum's third term, the council approved a motion to replace Surrey RCMP with a new municipal police force and started the termination process of its Police Service Agreement with the RCMP.

On February 27, 2020, Mike Farnworth, Minister of Public Safety and Solicitor General, approved the creation of the Surrey Police Board, which is responsible for overseeing the Surrey Police Service. The Board appointed Norm Lipinski, the former deputy police chief of neighbouring Delta, British Columbia, as the first chief constable for the Surrey Police Service in November 2020.

In November 2021, the first Surrey Police Service officers were deployed alongside Surrey RCMP officers.

On March 10, 2022, a Surrey Police officer was stabbed and wounded during an arrest.

Organization

Budget 
An operational budget of $184 million was planned for the fiscal year 2021, while another $63.7 million was budgeted over five years from 2020 to 2024 to complete the transition from the RCMP.

Policing Districts 
There will be five SPS districts, aligned with the city of Surrey neighbourhood boundaries. A District Inspector will manage each district. The Metro Team will be a flexible unit responsible for a citywide patrol.
 District 1 (City Centre/Whalley)
 District 2 (Fleetwood/Guildford)
 District 3 (Newton)
 District 4 (Cloverdale)
 District 5 (South Surrey)
 Metro Team (Citywide Patrol)

Divisions 
SPS maintains three bureaus, each managed by a Deputy Chief Constable:

Community Policing Bureau
 Patrol Section
 Patrol Support Section
 Diversity and Community Support Section
 Detention Services Section
 Operations Communications Centre

Investigative Services Bureau
 Major Crime Section
 Organized Crime Section
 Special Investigations Section
 Property Crime Section
 Analysis and Investigations Support Section

Support Services Bureau
 Human Resources Section
 Professional Standards Section
 Recruiting and Training Section
 Information Management Section
 Financial Services Section
 Planning and Research Section

List of chief constables
 Norm Lipinski (2020–present)

Controversies

Opposition to municipal policing 
The National Police Federation (NPF), the bargaining agent representing 20,000 RCMP officers across Canada, and some community members raised opposition to the establishment of a municipal police force on the basis of risks, costs, and low approval ratings according to studies commissioned by the NPF. The two groups attempted to force a province-wide referendum on the issue in 2021, but failed to secure enough signatures for the vote to proceed.

In early 2021, Mayor Doug McCallum claimed that the NPF used "unethical publicity stunts" and "racist elements" to politicize the transition. In September of that year, the NPF attempted to trademark five Surrey Police-related brands, including "Surrey Police Department," "Surrey Police Board," and "Surrey Police Union."

Jeff Shantz, a professor at Kwantlen Polytechnic University, accused the NPF of astroturfing community opposition to the Surrey Police Service, citing the close relationship between strategists hired by supposedly community-based organizations and the NPF.

Hiring 
During the transition process, the Surrey Police Service was accused of "poaching" officers from neighbouring municipal police forces as it rapidly expanded and recruited experienced officers from 18 police forces. In 2022, the Service entered into its first contract with the Surrey Police Union, which included agreements that new recruits would be among the highest-paid in the country and a parity clause that ensured that annual raises would match those of the nearby Vancouver Police Department.

See also 
 E-Comm, 9-1-1 call and dispatch centre for Southwestern BC
 RCMP "E" Division, a division of federal and provincial police force headquartered in Surrey
 Combined Forces Special Enforcement Unit – British Columbia
 Metro Vancouver Transit Police, police force dedicated to the public transit system

References

External links 
 Surrey Police Service
 Surrey Police Board

2020 establishments in British Columbia
Government agencies established in 2020
Law enforcement agencies of British Columbia
Politics of Surrey, British Columbia